Maksim Viktorovich Surayev (born 24 May 1972) is a retired Russian cosmonaut and politician. He served in the State Duma between 2016 and 2021.

Personal
Surayev was born in Chelyabinsk. During his childhood, Suraev lived in several places due to his father's military commitments. First he moved from his birthplace, Chelyabinsk in the Urals, to Siberia. When his father entered the military academy, the Suraev family moved again to the environs of Moscow.  While his father served several postings, Suraev again moved from one town to another around Moscow.

Surayev is married to Suraeva (née Khorokhordina) Anna Alexandrovna. They have two daughters, Arina and Ksenia.  His recreational interests include sports and reading. He is a qualified diver and paraborne instructor.

Education
Surayev graduated with honors from the Kacha Air Force Pilot School as pilot-engineer in 1994; graduated with honors from the Zhukovski Air Force Academy in 1997 as pilot-engineer-researcher. In 2007, he received a law degree from the Russian Academy of Civil Service.

Awards
Maksim Surayev is a recipient of the Gold Star Medal of Hero of Russia. He received the medal from the Russian president Dmitry Medvedev on 30 December 2010.

Experience 
Surayev is qualified to fly L-39 and Su-27 aircraft, and has logged around 700 hours of flight time. Surayev is a Class 3 Air Force pilot, a qualified diver and paraborne instructor.

Cosmonaut career
From December 1997 to November 1999, Surayev completed basic space training. In November 1999 he was qualified as a test-cosmonaut. From January 2000 he was in ISS advanced training. From March 2006 until April 2008 Surayev was assigned as a  backup ISS Expedition 17 crew member. From April 2008 until March 2009 he was a member of the ISS Expedition 19 backup crew.

Expedition 21/22 
Surayev served as a Flight Engineer on the International Space Station as a member of the Expedition 22 crew. He also served in the same capacity during Expedition 21 having traveled to the station aboard Soyuz TMA-16 on 30 September 2009 from the Baikonour cosmodrome in Kazakhstan. He was the commander of the Soyuz spacecraft. Surayev with Jeffrey Williams landed their Soyuz TMA-16 spacecraft on the steppes of Kazakhstan on 18 March 2010, concluding a 167-day stay aboard the International Space Station.

Surayev kept a blog while in space.

Expedition 40/41 
Surayev served as a Flight Engineer on the International Space Station as a member of the Expedition 40/41 crew. The Soyuz TMA-13M spacecraft commanded by Surayev and carrying crew mates Alexander Gerst and Reid Wiseman lifted off from Baikonour's historic 1/5 launch pad on 28 May 2014. Soyuz TMA-13M docked with the space station's Rassvet Module on 29 May, approximately six hours after launch.

As part of the ISS crew, Surayev conducted scientific activities and saw extensive visiting vehicle traffic including the Russian Progress freighter, the American Dragon and Cygnus spacecraft, and the final mission of the European ATV - Georges Lemaître ATV. He served as ISS expedition commander of Expedition 41 from 10 September until 10 November 2014. The mission returned to Earth on 10 November at 03:58 UTC.

Spacewalks 

On 14 January 2010 Surayev went outside the ISS into space with fellow Russian cosmonaut Oleg Kotov to begin his first spacewalk. The spacewalk started at 10:05 GMT when Surayev and Kotov donned in new Russian Orlan-MK computerised spacesuits floated out of the Pirs Docking compartment airlock. The spacewalking duo connected cables between the Poisk and Zvezda modules, installed docking targets and Kurs aerials and attached additional handrails to exit hatches. They also retrieved a Russian biological experiment from the outside hull of the ISS and tossed out two big wads of space trash that contained unneeded insulation covers. The spacewalk lasted 5 hours and 44 minutes.

Surayev and cosmonaut Aleksandr Samokutyaev performed a spacewalk (Russian EVA-40) outside the space station on 22 October 2014. Although planned as a six-hour spacewalk, the cosmonauts were able to complete all the scheduled tasks in 3 hours and 38 minutes. During the extravehicular activity, Surayev and Samokutyaev dismantled the RK 21-8 Radiometria science payload and the 2ASF1-1 and 2ASF1-2 KURS antennas from the Poisk module. The RK-21-8 science payload was installed aboard the Space Station during the Russian EVA-28 in early 2011 and consisted of an antenna system with calibrator, a Microwave Radiometer receiver system and a Command-Information Unit. It was used for a series of seismic forecast and earthquake studies. The RK-21-8 payload was jettisoned by Surayev 33 minutes into the EVA on a safe departure trajectory from the Space Station. Surayev and Samokutyaev also released a protective cover from the EXPOSE-R payload developed by the European Space Agency to conduct astrobiology studies by exposing samples and experiments to the space environment. When the cosmonauts finished operations at the Poisk module, they photographed the surface of the orbital station for specialists to assess its condition later. Russian EVA-40 was the 184th spacewalk in support of the Space Station assembly.

Politics
In 2016, he was elected to the State Duma from the United Russia party and retired from the cosmonaut corps.

References

External links 

  
 Spacefacts biography of Maksim Surayev

1972 births
Living people
Russian cosmonauts
Russian bloggers
Crew members of the International Space Station
Commanders of the International Space Station
Heroes of the Russian Federation
Seventh convocation members of the State Duma (Russian Federation)
United Russia politicians
21st-century Russian politicians
Spacewalkers